Central Nicobarese is a group of Nicobarese languages spoken by 10,000 people (as of the 2001 census) on the Nicobar Islands. The varieties spoken on the various islands apart from Trinket are not mutually intelligible, and are considered separate languages:
Nanmeowry (Nankwari)
Camorta (Kamorta)
Katchal (Tehnu)

References

Nicobarese languages